Milan Švenger (born 6 July 1986) is a Czech professional footballer from the Czech Republic. He plays as a goalkeeper for Viktoria Žižkov. He played for the Czech Republic national U-21 football team.

References

External links
 
 Profile at iDNES.cz
 

Living people
1986 births
Sportspeople from Jablonec nad Nisou
Czech footballers
Czech Republic youth international footballers
Czech Republic under-21 international footballers
Association football goalkeepers
Czech First League players
AC Sparta Prague players
FK Baník Most players
FK Senica players
Slovak Super Liga players
Expatriate footballers in Slovakia
Czech expatriate sportspeople in Slovakia
1. FK Příbram players
Bohemians 1905 players
FC Sellier & Bellot Vlašim players
FK Čáslav players
SK Sparta Krč players
FC Fastav Zlín players
FK Viktoria Žižkov players
Czech National Football League players
Bohemian Football League players
Czech expatriate footballers